Norbert Trandafir (born 8 February 1988 in Târgu Mureş) is a Romanian swimmer of partial Hungarian descent. He competed at the 2008, 2012 and 2016 Summer Olympics.  He holds 2 Romanian records: the 50 m freestyle and the 50 m butterfly (short course).

Personal bests
50 m freestyle : 21.98 (Barcelona, 2013) - Long course 
100 m freestyle : 48.75 (Rome, 2009) - Long course
50 m butterfly : 24.26 (Rome, 2009) - Long course

References

1988 births
Living people
Sportspeople from Târgu Mureș
Swimmers at the 2008 Summer Olympics
Swimmers at the 2012 Summer Olympics
Swimmers at the 2016 Summer Olympics
Olympic swimmers of Romania
Romanian male butterfly swimmers
Romanian sportspeople of Hungarian descent
European Aquatics Championships medalists in swimming
Universiade medalists in swimming
Universiade silver medalists for Romania
Medalists at the 2011 Summer Universiade
Romanian male freestyle swimmers